Dulce María is a Mexican actress and singer-songwriter. In 2014, Dulce was nominated for Europe Music Awards, winning North Latin America Act and Best Latin America Act, being the first Mexican to reach the mundial category.

Diosas de Plata

|-
| rowspan="1"|2015
| rowspan="1"|¿Por qué los hombres son infieles?
| Female Co-acting
|
|-

Eliot Media Awards

|-
| rowspan="1"|2015
| rowspan="1"|Dulce María
| True Likes
|
|-

MTV Europe Music Award
The MTV Europe Music Awards were established in 1994 by MTV Networks Europe to celebrate the most popular music videos in Europe.

|-
|rowspan="3"|2014
|rowspan="1"|Dulce María
| Best Latin America North Act
|
|-
|rowspan="1"|Dulce María
| Best Latin America Act
|
|-
|rowspan="1"|Dulce María
|Best Worldwide Act
|
|-

Lo Mejor de la Música Univision

|-
| rowspan="1"|2011
| rowspan="1"|Extranjera
| Best Album
|
|-

Los Fan Choice Awards

|-
| rowspan="1"|2015
| rowspan="1"|Dulce María
| Best Showcase of The Year
|
|-

MTV Millennials Awards

|-
| rowspan="2"|2013
| rowspan="1"|Dulce María
| Twitter Star
|
|-
| rowspan="1"| Dulcetes
|Best Fandom
|
|-
| rowspan="2"|2014
| rowspan="1"|Dulce María
| Latin Instagram Star
|
|-
| rowspan="1"|Dulce María
|Latin Twitter Star
|
|-
| rowspan="2"|2015
| rowspan="1"|Dulce María
| Mexican Instagram Star
|
|-
| rowspan="1"|O Lo Haces Tú O Lo Hago Yo
|Hit of The Year
|
|-

Nickelodeon Kids' Choice Awards 
The Nickelodeon Kids' Choice Awards is an annual awards show, that honors the year's biggest television, movie, and music acts, as voted by the people.

|-
| rowspan="1" align="center"|2012
| rowspan="1"|Dulce María
| Favorite Latin Artist
|
|-
| rowspan="1" align="center"|2015
| rowspan="1"|Dulce María
| Favorite Latin Artist
|
|-

Nickelodeon Mexico Kids' Choice Awards
The Nickelodeon Kids Choice Awards Mexico is an annual awards show that awards entertainers with a blimp trophy, as voted by kids on internet.

|-
| rowspan="2"|2011	
| rowspan="1"| Dulce María
|Favorite Latin Solo Act
|
|-
| rowspan="1"| Dulce María
|Pro-social Award
|
|-
|2012
| rowspan="1"| Dulce María
|Favorite Latin Solo Act
|
|-
| rowspan="2"|2015
| rowspan="1"| Dulce María
| Favorite National Solo or Group Act
|
|-
| "O Lo Haces Tú O Lo Hago Yo"
| Favorite Song
|
|-
| rowspan="2"|2016
| rowspan="1"| Dulce María
| Favorite National Solo or Group Act
|
|-
| Dulce María
| Trendy Girl
|
|-

Meus Prêmios Nick
Meus Prêmios Nick (Portuguese for "My Nick Awards"), the Brazilian version of the American Kids' Choice Awards, was launched in 2000, and held annually ever since. The artists most voted by viewers are awarded a hollow orange blimp figurine called "Zeppy".

|-
|2011
| rowspan="1"| Dulce María
| rowspan="1"|Favorite International Artist
|
|-
|2014
| rowspan="1"| Dulce María
| rowspan="1"|Favorite International Artist
|
|-

Orgullosamente Latino

|-
| rowspan="2"|2010
| rowspan="1"|Dulce María
| Latin Female Solo Artist
|
|-
| rowspan="1"|Inevitable
| Latin Song of the Year
|
|-

Premios Eclipse

|-
| rowspan="2"|2010
| rowspan="1"|Dulce María
| Best Pop Act
|
|-
| rowspan="1"|Extranjera
| Best Album of the Year
|
|-

Premios FebreTeen

|-
| rowspan="1"|2016
| rowspan="1"|Dulce María
| Latin Artist of the Year
|
|-

Premios G1 Globo

|-
| rowspan="1"|2010
| rowspan="1"|Dulce María
| Best Female Singer
|
|-

Premios Juventud

|-
|rowspan="4"|2005
|rowspan="3"|Dulce María
|Girl of My Dreams
| rowspan="1" 
|-
|She's Got Style
| rowspan="1" 
|-
|iQue rico se mueve! (Best moves)
| rowspan="1" 
|-
|rowspan="1"|Dulce María and Alfonso Herrera
|Hottest Romance
| rowspan="1" 
|-
|rowspan="5"|2006
|rowspan="4"|Dulce María
|She's Got Style
| rowspan="1" 
|-
|Girl of My Dreams
| rowspan="1" 
|-
|iQue rico se mueve! (Best moves)
| rowspan="1" 
|-
|My Idol is...
| rowspan="1" 
|-
|rowspan="1"|Dulce María and Guillermo Ochoa
|Hottest Romance
| rowspan="1" 
|-
|rowspan="4"|2007
|rowspan="11"|Dulce María
|iQue rico se mueve! (Best moves)
| rowspan="1" 
|-
|Girl of My Dreams
| rowspan="1" 
|-
|She's Got Style
| rowspan="1" 
|-
|My Idol is...
| rowspan="1" 
|-
|rowspan="4"|2008
|Girl of My Dreams
| rowspan="1" 
|-
|iQue rico se mueve! (Best moves)
| rowspan="1" 
|-
|She's Got Style
| rowspan="1" 
|-
|My Idol is...
| rowspan="1" 
|-
|rowspan="10"|2009
|Girl of My Dreams
| rowspan="1" 
|-
|iQue rico se mueve! (Best moves)
| rowspan="1" 
|-
|She's Got Style
| rowspan="1" 
|-
|rowspan="1"|"El Regalo Más Grande" (ft. Tiziano Ferro and Anahí)
|The Perfect Combo
| rowspan="1" 
|-
|rowspan="4"|Dulce María
|My Idol is...
| rowspan="1" 
|-
|Paparazzi's Favorite Target
| rowspan="1" 
|-
|Favorite Vocal
| rowspan="1" 
|-
|Favorite pop star
| rowspan="1" 
|-
|rowspan="1"|"El Verano"
|Catchiest Tune
| rowspan="1" 
|-
|rowspan="1"|Dulce María and Pablo Lyle
|Hottest Romance
| rowspan="1" 
|-
|rowspan="3"|2011
|rowspan="1"|Extranjera
|I Hear Her Everywhere
| rowspan="1" 
|-
|rowspan="2"|Dulce María
|iQue rico se mueve! (Best moves)
| rowspan="1" 
|-
|She's Got Style
| rowspan="1" 
|-
|rowspan="4"|2013
|rowspan="3"|"Es Un Drama"
|Catchiest Tune
| rowspan="1" 
|-
|My Favorite Video
| rowspan="1" 
|-
|My Ringtone
| rowspan="1" 
|-
|rowspan="1"|Dulce María
|Favourite pop star
| rowspan="1" 
|-
|rowspan="1"|2016
|rowspan="1"|"Dejarte de Amar"
|Best Ballad
| rowspan="1" 
|-

Premios Lo Nuestro

|-
| rowspan="1"|2012
| rowspan="1"|Dulce María
| Best New Pop Artist or Group of The Year
| rowspan="1" 
|-

Premios Luminaria de Oro

|-
| rowspan="1"|2011
| rowspan="1"|Extranjera
| Best Album of The Year
| rowspan="1" 
|-

Prêmios Mas Que Telenovelas

|-
| rowspan="1"|2013
| rowspan="1"|Mentir Pra Vivir
| Favorite Female Special Acting
| rowspan="1" 
|-

Premios MTV Novelas

|-
| rowspan="1"|2013
| rowspan="1"|Es Un Drama
| Best Musical Theme
| rowspan="1" 
|-

Premios People en Español

|-
|rowspan="1"|2009
|rowspan="1"|Verano de Amor
|Best Young Actress
| rowspan="1" 
|-
|rowspan="2"|2010
|rowspan="1"|Inevitable
|Best Song Of The Year
| rowspan="1" 
|-
|rowspan="1"|Dulce María
|Best Pop Artist/Group
| rowspan="1" 
|-
|rowspan="2"|2011
|rowspan="1"|Extranjera
|Best Album
| rowspan="1" 
|-
|rowspan="1"|Dulce María
|Best Pop Artist/Group 
| rowspan="1" 
|-
|rowspan="1"|2012
|rowspan="1"|Dulce María
|Queen of Facebook
| rowspan="1" 
|-
|rowspan="1"|2013
|rowspan="1"|Lágrimas feat. Julión Álvarez
|Collaboration Of The Year
| rowspan="1" 
|-
|rowspan="1"|2014
|rowspan="1"|Dulce María
|Favorite Female Act
| rowspan="1"

Premios Quiero

|-
|rowspan="1"|2010
|rowspan="1"|Inevitable
|Best Female Video
| rowspan="1" 
|-
|rowspan="1"|2011
|rowspan="1"|Ingenua
|Best Female Video
| rowspan="1" 
|-

Premios Telehit

|-
|rowspan="1"|2010
|rowspan="1"|Dulce María
|Young Act Of The Year
| rowspan="1" 
|-

Premios Texas

|-
|rowspan="1"|2011
|rowspan="1"|Dulce María
|Best Rock Act
| rowspan="1" 
|-
|rowspan="2"|2012
|rowspan="1"|Dulce María
|Favorite Female Act
| rowspan="1" 
|-
|rowspan="1"|Dulce María
|Best Pop Act
| rowspan="1" 
|-

Premios TVyNovelas

|-
|rowspan="1"|2006
|rowspan="1"|Rebelde
|Best Young Female Special Acting
| rowspan="1" 
|-

Premios TVZ

|-
|rowspan="1"|2010
|rowspan="1"|Dulce María
|International Artist
| rowspan="1" 
|-

Recognitions

 2006: Quien magazine  named her one of "Most Beautiful of 2006", heading the list. 
 2007: People en Español magazine named her one of "50 Most Beautiful".
 2010: Quien magazine named her one of "Most Beautiful of 2006", heading the list.
 2010: People en Español magazine named her one of "50 Most Beautiful".
 2011: Won a plate at "PLAZA DE LAS ESTRELLAS" in recognition of her artistic career.
 2011: Won platinum album in Brazil by selling more than 40,000 copies of her album Extranjera.
 2011: Vip magazine named her one of "The 100 Sexiest Women of all time".
 2011: The magazine People en Español named her one of "50 Most Beautiful".
 2012: Caras magazine named her one of "20 Most Beautiful".
 2014: Febre Teen magazine named her "Latin Star of the Year".
 2015: Para Todos magazine gave an "Best Latin Singer" award for her at the 20th Anniversary of the magazine.
 2015: The musical "Rock Of Ages" win a "Placa De Bronze" at "Plaza De Las Estrella".
 2015: Was the Mexican with the best peak (#7) at Billboard Social 50.
 2015: Agrupación de Periodistas Teatrales (APT) named the musical "Rock of Ages) as "Best Rock Musical".
 2016: People en Español magazine named her one of "50 Most Beautiful".
 2016: TVyNovelas magazine named her one of The Most Beautiful Of Mexico.

References

María, Dulce